Netperf is a software application that provides network bandwidth testing between two hosts on a network. It supports Unix domain sockets, TCP, SCTP, DLPI and UDP via BSD Sockets. Netperf provides a number of predefined tests e.g. to measure bulk (unidirectional) data transfer or request response performance.

Netperf was originally developed at Hewlett Packard.

See also
 Nuttcp
 Iperf
 NetPIPE
 bwping
 Flowgrind
 Measuring network throughput
 Packet generation model

References

External links
Homepage of netperf 

Computer network analysis
Network performance